Bougainville was a  of the French Navy launched on 25 April 1931 and commissioned on 15 February 1933. The ship was designed to operate from French colonies in Asia and Africa and initially stationed in the Indian Ocean. In 1935 it was transferred for service in the eastern and southern Mediterranean, and in early 1939 to Djibouti, returning to Toulon escorting a group of submarines after the outbreak of World War II.

It sided with Vichy France and was sunk by off Libreville by its sister ship  on 9 November 1940 in the Battle of Gabon. Although refloated in March 1941, Bougainville sank again and was finally broken up in 1952.

References

Bibliography

Further reading

Bougainville-class avisos
Ships built in France
1931 ships
Maritime incidents in November 1940
World War II shipwrecks in the Atlantic Ocean